The Elzey Hughes House was a building located at 308 Second Street in Falmouth, Kentucky.  It was listed on the National Register of Historic Places in 1983.  It was built for Elzey Hughes, a son of Charity Southgate and was significant as one of the few remaining buildings of Falmouth's segregated black district, Happy Hollow.

See also 
 Charity's House: Also in Happy Hallow
 National Register of Historic Places listings in Pendleton County, Kentucky

References

 Elzey Hughes House National Register of Historic Places digital asset.
PDF 52 Kentucky Historic Resources Inventory, archived 28 February 2016.
photo 39, Elzey Hughes House from the SE, archived 28 February 2016.

Houses in Pendleton County, Kentucky
National Register of Historic Places in Pendleton County, Kentucky
Houses on the National Register of Historic Places in Kentucky
African-American history of Kentucky
Former buildings and structures in Kentucky
Falmouth, Kentucky